Giovanni Alfonso Petrucci (18 December 1650 – January 1688) was a Roman Catholic prelate who served as Bishop of Belcastro (1686–1688).

Biography
Giovanni Alfonso Petrucci was born in Cutro, Italy on 18 December 1650 and ordained a priest on 23 December 1673.
On 15 July 1686, he was appointed during the papacy of Pope Innocent XI as Bishop of Belcastro.
On 28 July 1686, he was consecrated bishop by Galeazzo Marescotti, Cardinal-Priest of Santi Quirico e Giulitta, with Pietro de Torres, Archbishop of Dubrovnik, and Marcantonio Barbarigo, Archbishop of Corfù, serving as co-consecrators. 
He served as Bishop of Belcastro until his death in January 1688.

References

External links and additional sources
 (for Chronology of Bishops) 
 (for Chronology of Bishops) 

People from the Province of Crotone
17th-century Italian Roman Catholic bishops
Bishops appointed by Pope Innocent XI
1650 births
1688 deaths